The second elections to the Carmarthenshire County Council were held in May 1999. It was preceded by the 1995 election and followed by the 2004 election. They resulted in a coalition between Independent councillors and Plaid Cymru for the next five years.

Overview

|}

Results

Abergwili (one seat)

Ammanford (one seat)
Boundary Change. Two sitting members contested the seat.

Betws (one seat)

Bigyn (two seats)
No boundary changes but the number of seats reduced from three to two.

Burry Port (two seats)
The Liberal Democrats won both seats in 1995 but Labour captured one of these in a by-election following the death of a sitting member.

Bynea (one seat)

Carmarthen Town North (two seats)

Carmarthen Town South (two seats)
One of the seats was won by the Liberal Democrats in 1995 but lost to an Independent at a by-election following the death of the sitting member. The sitting Labour councillor, who had served on Carmarthen District Council since 1979, was de-selected by the party but was re-elected as an Independent Labour candidate.

Carmarthen Town West (two seats)

Cenarth (one seat)

Cilycwm (one seat)
Boundary change.

Cynwyl Elfed (one seat)
Boundary Change. Two sitting members contested the seat.

Cynwyl Gaeo (one seat)
Boundary Change.

Dafen (one seat)

Elli (one seat)

Felinfoel (one seat)

Garnant (one seat)

Glanaman (one seat)

Glanymor (two seats)

Glyn (one seat)

Gorslas (two seats)

Hendy (one seat)

Hengoed (two seats)

Kidwelly (one seat)

Laugharne Township (one seat)

Llanboidy (one seat)

Llanddarog (one seat)

Llandeilo (one seat)

Llandovery Town (one seat)

Llandybie  (two seats)

Llanegwad and Llanfynydd (one seat)

Llanfihangel Aberbythych (one seat)

Llanfihangel-ar-Arth (one seat)

Llangadog  (one seat)
No Boundary Change. Ward named changed.

Llangeler (one seat)

Llangennech (two seats)

Llangunnor (one seat)

Llangyndeyrn (one seat)
An unusual situation arose in this ward where the sitting Labour member (and previously a member of Dyfed County Council since 1981) announced shortly before the close of nominations that he would not stand and pledged his support to the Plaid Cymru candidate.

Llannon (two seats)
The previous Cross Hands (one seat) and Tumble (two seats) wards were merged to form a new two-seat ward. Three sitting councillors sought election.

Llansteffan (one seat)

Llanybydder (one seat)

Lliedi (two seats)

Llwynhendy (two seats)
No boundary change. One of the sitting Labour councillors was de-selected but successfully retained the seat as an Independent Labour candidate.

Manordeilo and Salem  (one seat)

Pembrey (two seats)
One of the sitting Labour members was de-selected and stood unsuccessfully as an Independent.

Penygroes (one seat)

Pontamman (one seat)

Pontyberem (one seat)

Quarter Bach  (one seat)
No boundary changes. Ward name changed.

St Clears (one seat)

St Ishmaels (one seat)

Saron (two seats)
No boundary changes but an additional seat created

Swiss Valley (one seat)

Trelech (one seat)

Trimsaran (one seat)

Tycroes (one seat)

Tyisha (two seats)

Whitland (one seat)

By-elections 1999-2004

Pontyberem 2000

A by-election was held in the Pontyberem ward following the death of Independent Labour councillor Ieuan Edwards.

Hengoed 2001

Llandybie 2001
A by-election was held in the Llandybie ward following the death of Independent councillor Gerald Earl, who had represented the ward on the Dyfed and Carmarthenshire councils since 1973.

References

1999
1999 Welsh local elections
20th century in Carmarthenshire